This is a list of hash functions, including cyclic redundancy checks, checksum functions, and cryptographic hash functions.

Cyclic redundancy checks

Adler-32 is often mistaken for a CRC, but it is not: it is a checksum.

Checksums

Universal hash function families

Non-cryptographic hash functions

Keyed cryptographic hash functions

Unkeyed cryptographic hash functions

See also
Hash function security summary
Secure Hash Algorithms
NIST hash function competition
Key derivation functions (category)

References

List
Checksum algorithms
Cryptography lists and comparisons